Hacktivist News Service is a French alternative media comparable to Indymedia.

Anti-globalization organizations
Alternative journalism organizations